Conty is a commune in the Somme department in Hauts-de-France in northern France.

Origin of the name
Conty comes from cond (confluence) (of the rivers and streams in the valley). The Princes of Conti, a minor branch of French royalty, took their name from Conty.

Geography
The commune comprises the village Conty and two hamlets: Luzières and Wailly (since 1973).

Nestling by the banks of the river Selle (a tributary of the Somme) that, at Conty, comprises several small branches that converge here.

Economic and tourist activities
 The Ateliers du Val de Selle, created in 1970, is a centre for those artisans involved with horses, riding and carriage-driving.
 The SIC (Société industrielle de Conty), created in 1928, specialises in non-ferrous foundry work,
 The Selle sawmills.
 The Coulée verte, a public right-of-way, is used by ramblers, cyclists and riders alike. For over 10 miles, it follows part of an old railway line between Beauvais and Amiens, which closed in 1979.
 The Cabinet du Dr Dutilloy, a classic example of 20th-century French medical architecture, is worth visiting. Guided tours on request.

Population

History

The river, the woods and the promontory, which dominates the valley, were the contributing factors for populating the area. Recent quarrying has exposed evidence of prehistoric life in the district, in the shape of bones and tools. 
Conty is on the old Roman road to Beauvais. Gallo-Roman remains have been found, in the form of burial sites.
In the 10th century, the Norman feudal system was in place at Conty. The first ‘seigneur’ Oger de Conty, is mentioned in 1044. 
During the Middle Ages, the wars between France and its neighbours affect Conty as it did many northern French towns 
In 1589, the castle was taken by the  Catholic League  of Amiens. 
Fires burned the village down several times, in 1691, 1709, 1734, 1809, 1812, 1825 and 1827 
In 1758, melting snow created a major flood throughout the town. 
In 1790, because of rioting, the National guard were called to the town to restore order.
1832 and cholera breaks out. The marshy nature of the ground is blamed for the epidemic.
Around 1850, the new market hall was built, replacing an old wooden structure. Constructed of  brick and roofed with slate by the architect Firmin Lombard. It was not just a market, but the council chamber, Mayor’s office and a court.

In 1907, Battersby Hats, a hat manufacturer of Stockport, England, bought a second factory in Conty, and it was managed by William John Battersby's son, Ernest.

1876 saw the coming of the railway to the town. By 1939, it was closed to all but freight traffic
and it shut down completely in 1979.

Places of interest
The castle
The first castle, built after the rampages of Attila the Hun around 450, was later laid waste by the Normans. Colart de Mailly rebuilt it in 1430. It was seized on 23 October 1589 by the Catholic League from Amiens, who decided to pull it down. Conty’s inhabitants refused to participate in the demolition. Jehan de Morlencourt and a Captain Saint-Jean were charged with the mission by the council of Amiens. It took eight days hard work to complete the task.
All that's apparent nowadays is a mound with a notice board with ‘motte féodale’ on it.

Church of Saint-Antoine

Dating from the 15th and 16th century, the stone church is in the Flamboyant Gothic style. The plan is the shape of a cross, about 30 meters long by 21 metres wide. The magnificent square tower is 33 metres high. The hanging sculptures in the vaulting and the gargoyles on the tower are deemed worthy of a look. The coat of arms of the Conti family, who were ‘seigneurs’ of Conty, can be seen in the left transept. Some 18th-century wooden statues decorate the area around the altar.

Chateau of Wailly
In the town, at the end of a grand avenue, is to be found the remains, in brick and stone, of the old château of Wailly. Built in Louis XIII style, in a semi-circular design. Very few archives exist relating the history of the construction of the château. Building began about 1640 and continued to 1690. Around 1785, a new building was constructed next to the ruins of the old one. In September 1944, Bernard Montgomery established his general headquarters here.

Chateau of Luzières

The château de Luzières is found in the hamlet of Luzières, to the south of Conty, in the small valley leading to Belleuse. It was built in the years 1770-1793. In the grounds, surrounded by water, are some older dependencies, from around 1715.

The château, of neoclassical design, is built of torching, on foundations of limestone, with brick pinioning, typical of the buildings of Picardy.

Annual events

Conty is a horse town. Carriage-driving championships are held here every year. In 2009, the heavy horse world championships will be held here.

See also
 Communes of the Somme department
 Princes of Conti

References

External links

  Club de football du Conty Loeuilly Sporting Club 

Communes of Somme (department)
Picardy